Working Wonders Children's Museum was a small children's museum in the downtown Old Mill District of Bend, Oregon, United States.

The tagline of the museum was Explore. Discover. Imagine. Create. Connect.

The museum closed on October 3, 2009, due to the poor economic conditions in Central Oregon which caused difficulty in fundraising efforts for the museum.

External links 
 
 Closure notice

Children's museums in Oregon
Buildings and structures in Bend, Oregon
Museums in Deschutes County, Oregon
Defunct museums in Oregon
Culture of Bend, Oregon
2009 disestablishments in Oregon